Blaenau Ffestiniog (Pantyrafon) was the London and North Western Railway's (LNWR) first passenger station in Blaenau Ffestiniog, then in Merionethshire, now in Gwynedd, Wales. It opened on 22 July 1879 as a temporary structure for use until the company's permanent station opened on 1 April 1881, when the temporary structure closed. It was situated within yards of the southern portal of Ffestiniog Tunnel.

Context
The evolution of Blaenau's passenger stations was complex with five different railway companies providing services to the area.

The station's name
Different sources refer to the station as "Blaenau Festiniog", "Pantyrafon", "Blaenau Festiniog (1)", or give descriptions, such as "a temporary station at the 'town' end of the tunnel", "the first temporary station", or "a temporary terminus near the foot of the Llechwedd incline".

Whatever it was called, the station served workers living in the Conwy Valley and working in the quarries north west of Blaenau, but was half a mile from the town itself.

The station today
No trace of the station survives.

Gallery

References

Sources

Other material

External links
 The station site on a navigable OS Map National Library of Scotland
 The station and line Rail Map Online
 The station on line LJT1 Railway Codes

Disused railway stations in Gwynedd
Railway stations in Great Britain opened in 1879
Railway stations in Great Britain closed in 1881
Former London and North Western Railway stations